Varghese Johnson (born April 28, 1982) is an amateur boxer from India who repeatedly medaled in the Super Heavyweight (+ 91 kg) division.

Career
In Melbourne at the Commonwealth Games 2006 he won Bronze, losing to David Price, who arose from three knockdowns to stop Johnson.

At the 2006 Asian Games he also won the bronze medal in a lost bout against Kazakhstan's Mukhtarkhan Dildabekov 13–32.

External links
Bio

References

1982 births
Living people
Indian male boxers
Recipients of the Arjuna Award
Malayali people
Commonwealth Games bronze medallists for India
Boxers at the 2006 Commonwealth Games
Asian Games medalists in boxing
Boxers at the 2002 Asian Games
Boxers at the 2006 Asian Games
Asian Games bronze medalists for India
Commonwealth Games medallists in boxing
Medalists at the 2006 Asian Games
Place of birth missing (living people)
Super-heavyweight boxers
21st-century Indian people
Medallists at the 2006 Commonwealth Games